Raphaël Comisetti (born 12 October 1971) is a retired Swiss football midfielder.

References

1971 births
Living people
Swiss men's footballers
FC Lausanne-Sport players
Yverdon-Sport FC players
Association football midfielders
Swiss Super League players
Switzerland under-21 international footballers